Synaescope is a metal band from Sydney, NSW that released its debut EP As The Light Fades in 2015. The band consists of Warren (vocals), Luke (guitar), Ishan (guitar), James (bass) and Daniel (drums).

In 2016 they topped the voting for Heavy Magazine's BEST UNDERGROUND BAND of 2015 and were also voted #1 band to appear at the (now defunct) nationwide LEGION MUSIC FESTIVAL.

March of 2017 they released the single The Illusion of Control on all major streaming platforms and stores, which marks the first time the band has worked with Forrester Savell (12 Foot Ninja, Karnivool, Birds of Tokyo).

Members

Current
Warren Harding – lead vocals (2014–present)
Luke Johnson – guitar (2015–present)
Ishan Karunanayake – guitar (2015–present)
James Brittain – bass (2018–present)
Michael Keeble – drums (2020–present)

Past
Daniel Waldow – drums (2017–2020)
Pablo Fernandez – bass (2014–2018)
Kayd Anderson – drums (2014–2017)
Matthew Hamm  – guitar (2014–2015)

Timeline

Discography

EPs
As The Light Fades (2015)

Singles
The Illusion of Control (2017)

Awards

References

Australian metalcore musical groups